Prüter, also Pruter or Prueter is a German last name which possibly derives from a personal name formed with a cognate of Old English prut meaning ‘proud’.

Notable people 
 Karl Prüter (1920–2007), American Old Catholic bishop
 Robert Pruter (born 1944), sports and music journalist

References

German-language surnames